Felmingham railway station is a former railway station in Norfolk, England. It was closed in 1959. It served the village of Felmingham.

References

Disused railway stations in Norfolk
Former Midland and Great Northern Joint Railway stations
Railway stations in Great Britain opened in 1883
Railway stations in Great Britain closed in 1959